Michael Richard Matarazzo (November 8, 1965 – August 16, 2014) was an American IFBB professional bodybuilder.

Originally from Boston, Massachusetts, Matarazzo moved to Venice, California to further his bodybuilding career. Formerly a boxer, Matarazzo first won the 1989 Gold's Gym Classic in Massachusetts. He competed for the first time in the Mr. Olympia contest in 1991. Known primarily for his massive arms and calves, his best placing in the Mr. Olympia competition (out of seven total appearances) was 9th, in 1998.

Matarazzo's last appearance in a professional bodybuilding event was the 2001 Mr. Olympia, where he placed 21st. He was forced to retire due to having open heart surgery on December 8, 2004 for clogged arteries. On November 8, 2007, Matarazzo suffered a heart attack, his second cardiac-related problem since his 2004 surgery. On August 3, 2014, Matarazzo was in the intensive care unit of Stanford hospital in Palo Alto due to heart complications. He died on August 16 while awaiting a heart transplant. At the time of his death he was residing in Modesto, California, and had been forced to stop working as a bail bondsman due to his 20% heart function.

Contest history
 1989 Gold's Gym Classic, 1st
 1991 NPC USA Championships, Heavyweight, 1st and Overall
 1991 Mr. Olympia, 16th
 1992 Arnold Classic, 15th
 1992 Ironman Pro Invitational, 5th
 1993 Marissa Classic, 6th
 1993 Night of Champions, 8th
 1993 Mr. Olympia, 18th
 1993 Pittsburgh Pro Invitational, 2nd
 1994 Arnold Classic, 9th
 1994 San Jose Pro Invitational, 8th
 1995 Florida Pro Invitational, 7th
 1995 South Beach Pro Invitational, 7th
 1996 Grand Prix Czech Republic, 9th
 1996 Grand Prix Russia, 9th
 1996 Grand Prix Switzerland, 9th
 1996 Night of Champions, 5th
 1996 Mr. Olympia, 13th
 1997 Canada Pro Cup, 2nd
 1997 Grand Prix Germany, 11th
 1997 Grand Prix Hungary, 10th
 1997 Grand Prix Spain, 10th
 1997 Night of Champions, 4th
 1997 Mr. Olympia, 13th
 1997 Toronto Pro Invitational, 2nd
 1998 Night of Champions, 3rd
 1998 Mr. Olympia, 9th
 1998 San Francisco Pro Invitational, 7th
 1998 Toronto Pro Invitational, 3rd
 1999 Mr. Olympia, 11th
 2000 Night of Champions, 18th
 2000 Toronto Pro Invitational, 6th
 2001 Night of Champions, 5th
 2001 Mr. Olympia, 21st

See also
 Arnold Classic
 List of male professional bodybuilders
 List of female professional bodybuilders
 Mr. Olympia

References

External links
Muscle & Fitness: Remembering Mike Matarazzo

1965 births
2014 deaths
Professional bodybuilders